Cristian Mercado is a Bolivian theater and film actor.
On film, he is known for his lead role as Falso Conejo in Sena/Quina, la inmortalidad del cangrejo and as Miguel, a fisherman in Undertow (Spanish title Contracorriente) alongside Manolo Cardona, a film that won Audience Award for World Cinema Drama at Sundance Film Festival in 2010. and his role as Inti Peredo in Che: Part Two. He also co star in films as The 33 of San Jose, movie based on the true storie of the 33 miners trapped in the landslide in Chile. He was also second assistant director in Los Andes no creen en Dios (The Andes Don't Believe in God (2007).

On theater, he was part of Teatro de los Andes group and found La Oveja Negra theater in 2005. He worked in France with "Theatre Athenor", in Chile with Teatro Camino company, and with Teatro de ciertos habitantes in Mexico.

Awards
2011: Won Best Actor Award at Rapa Nui Film Festival in Chile.
2014: Won Best theater actor Eduardo Abaroa Plurinational Price Bolivia

Filmography

Directing
2007: Los Andes no creen en Dios (second assistant director)

Acting
2004: El atraco as Ivo
2005: Sena/Quina, la inmortalidad del cangrejo as Falso Conejo
2007: Los Andes no creen en Dios as Paco
2008: Che: Part Two as Inti (Guido Peredo Liegue)
2009: Undertow (Spanish title Contracorriente) as Miguel
2010: The 33 of San Jose as Quechua
2011: Blackthorn as Official Boliviano
2019: Santa Clara as cowboy
2019: The Longest Night as Ivan

Shorts
2008: Desde el fondo as Antonio (short)
2011: El último paso as Mateo (short)
2017: Premi al millor chipiron
2018: premi al millor nadador de ESPAÑA
2019: premi al dislexic del mon

References

External links

Cristian Mercado official website

Bolivian male film actors
Bolivian male stage actors
Living people
21st-century Bolivian male actors
Year of birth missing (living people)
Place of birth missing (living people)